Thaw is a Foetus Interruptus album released by Self Immolation/Some Bizzare in September 1988 and also released on Some Bizzare 1995, by Thirsty Ear. The track "English Faggot/Nothin Man" was inspired by a harassing message Thirlwell received on his answering machine.

Track listing

Personnel 
Martin Bisi – engineering
J. G. Thirlwell (also credited as Clint Ruin) – instruments, arrangements, production, illustrations

Charts

References

External links 
 
 Thaw at foetus.org

1988 albums
Foetus (band) albums
Albums produced by JG Thirlwell
Some Bizzare Records albums